Ma chi t'ha dato la patente? (But who gave you your license?) is a 1970 Italian comedy film directed by Nando Cicero starring the comic duo Franco and Ciccio.

Plot 
Franco and Ciccio are the directors of a driving school. They suffer the theft of the only car they have, and their new car  is prone to going completely out of his control...

Cast 
 Franco Franchi: Franco
 Ciccio Ingrassia: Ciccio
 Angela Luce: Rosa 
 Eugene Walter:  The American Scientist
 Aldo Bufi Landi : Rosa's Husband
 Renato Baldini: Owner of the rival driving school 
 Nino Terzo: Bartolomeo
Luca Sportelli : driving examinator Dr. Bustella
Gino Pagnani : taft examinator driver license Dr. Filippetti
Maria Tedeschi: Mrs. Cuccurullo's maid

See also    
 List of Italian films of 1970

References

External links

1970 films
Italian buddy comedy films
1970s buddy comedy films
Films directed by Nando Cicero
Films about automobiles
Driver's education
Films scored by Carlo Rustichelli
1970 comedy films
Films set in Rome
Films shot in Rome
1970s Italian films